Fury on Wheels, also known as Jump, is a 1971 American car racing film.

Racing sequences were filmed at the now defunct Golden Gate Speedway in Tampa, Florida. Many local drivers can be seen.

Cast
Tom Ligon - Chester Jump 
Logan Ramsey - Babe Duggers 
Collin Wilcox - April Mae 
Norman Rose - Dutchman 
Lada Edmund Jr. - Enid 
Sudie Bond - Ernestine Jump 
Conrad Bain - Lester Jump 
Bette Craig - Beulah 
Vicky Lynn - Mercy Jump 
Jack Nance - Ace

References

External links

1971 films
Films shot in Florida
Golan-Globus films
1970s English-language films